Sebastián Nilo Carretero (born February 27, 1986, in (Trenque Lauquen (Buenos Aires), Argentina)) is an Argentine footballer currently playing for Unión La Calera of the Primera División in Chile.

Teams
  Atlético Trenque Lauquen 2005
  Barrio Alegre 2006
  Sarmiento de Junín 2006-2007
  Banfield 2007-2008
  Quilmes 2009
  Aldosivi de Mar del Plata 2009
  Tiro Federal 2010
  Gimnasia y Esgrima de Jujuy 2010-2011
  Deportivo Quito 2011
  Unión La Calera 2012

Titles
  Deportivo Quito 2011 (Ecuadorian Primera División Championship)

References
 
 

1986 births
Living people
Argentine footballers
Argentine expatriate footballers
Gimnasia y Esgrima de Jujuy footballers
Club Atlético Banfield footballers
Quilmes Atlético Club footballers
Aldosivi footballers
Tiro Federal footballers
S.D. Quito footballers
Unión La Calera footballers
Chilean Primera División players
Expatriate footballers in Chile
Expatriate footballers in Ecuador
Association footballers not categorized by position
Sportspeople from Buenos Aires Province
21st-century Argentine people